John Andrew Overtoom is an American animation director, writer, photographer, and cinematographer.  Recent credits include Nickelodeon’s The Patrick Star Show as well as the animated feature film The SpongeBob Movie: Sponge on the Run, where he served as CG animation director and head of character animation. He was supervising animation director on the Cartoon Network series Clarence, as well as the Disney animated television series Billy Dilley's Super-Duper Subterranean Summer where he was a writer and animation supervisor. In 1999, after two years as an animation timer on The Angry Beavers, Overtoom was hired as an animation director on the Nickelodeon animated television series SpongeBob SquarePants, for which he was nominated for Emmy Awards in 2004, 2007 and 2011. My Life with Morrissey is Overtoom's first award-winning live action feature as a writer/director/cinematographer and is distributed by MVD. Other credits include Family Guy and American Dad for Fox TV, and Phineas and Ferb and Dave the Barbarian for Disney.

Career 
After graduating, Overtoom attended Pasadena's yearly Animation Celebration, where his feature film No Parachute caught the attention of producer Mike Girard. Girard hired Overtoom onto Nickelodeon's The Angry Beavers, where he worked as an animation timer.

Overtoom moved as an animation director over to another Nickelodeon series, SpongeBob SquarePants, since the show had begun in 1999. Laura Fries of Variety praised his work on the 2002 special "SpongeBob's House Party": "Overtoom has created a very stylistic and vivid animated world that smacks of retro pastiche."

In August 2001, Overtoom began the production of his first feature film My Life with Morrissey, which he wrote, directed and photographed. The film premiered in 2003. Critic Stephen Dalton of The Times, in a positive review, wrote that "[B]ehind its high-camp, irreverent tone, Overtoom's film is clearly a twisted tribute." The film won the Audience Award at the 2003 Black Point Film Festival in Wisconsin.

In 2009 Overtoom and Vancouver Film School classmates Trent Noble and Yann Trembley animated the CG short film All in the Bunker. The offbeat comedy, written and directed by Overtoom, is a satire of modern day sitcom-culture and network television and stars Kurtwood Smith, Cheryl Hines and Don Novello.

Overtoom has served as an Timing Director on Family Guy episodes, a sheet timer for The Mighty B! and Timing Director on the Disney Channel animated series Phineas and Ferb. He served as the supervising animation director on the Cartoon Network series Clarence and the Disney XD animated series Billy Dilley's Super-Duper Subterranean Summer. In early 2018, Overtoom returned to SpongeBob SquarePants to work on season 12 as an animation director. He was subsequently hired as CG Animation Director at Paramount Pictures for the first all CG SpongeBob feature The SpongeBob Movie: Sponge on the Run, where he created a CG animation style constructed from commonly used techniques of 2D and stop-motion animation, relying heavily on his past work on  SpongeBob and also Nick Park's Oscar winning Wallace and Gromit short films The Wrong Trousers and A Close Shave. 
Overtoom was then promoted to Head of Character Animation (HOCA) by Paramount in the summer of 2018. 
In 2019, he headed to Montreal to continue production on the new SpongeBob feature film at Mikros Image, continuing his duties as CG Animation Director and Head of Character Animation (HOCA). The SpongeBob feature released in theaters in Canada on August 14, 2020.

Personal life 
Overtoom graduated from the Vancouver Film School, and also studied at Fordham University.

Filmography

Television

Film

References

External links 

Living people
American film directors
American animated film directors
American photographers
American animators
American male writers
Place of birth missing (living people)
Year of birth missing (living people)